Félix José Fermín Minaya (born October 9, 1963) is a Dominican former professional baseball shortstop who played in Major League Baseball (MLB) for the Pittsburgh Pirates (–), Cleveland Indians (–), Seattle Mariners (–) and Chicago Cubs.

Career
On August 22, 1989, Fermin tied an 87-year-old MLB record with four sacrifice hits in one game against the Seattle Mariners. Along with Reggie Jefferson, Fermín was traded by the Cleveland Indians to the Seattle Mariners in exchange for Omar Vizquel before the 1994 season. Fermín was a regular starter in 1995 when the Mariners won the American League's Western Division. He led the AL in sacrifice hits (32) in 1989; he also led the AL in most at bats per strikeout (34.3) in 1993. In 1996, Fermin was very nearly traded to the Yankees for Mariano Rivera.

In a 10-season career, Fermín played in 903 games and had 2,767 at-bats, 294 runs, 718 hits, 86 doubles, 11 triples, 4 home runs, 207 runs batted in, 27 stolen bases, 166 walks, a .259 batting average, a .305 on-base percentage, a .303 slugging average, 838 total bases.

Fermín is the current manager for Águilas Cibaeñas of the Dominican Winter League. Since , he led the team to five championships until he was removed from the job in 2009.  He was then hired to be the manager for the Gigantes del Cibao until the Aguilas Cibaeñas hired him back in 2011.

As a player, his nickname was "El Gato", for Felix the Cat and his quick reflexes and defense too.

References

External links

1963 births
Living people
Águilas Cibaeñas players
Buffalo Bisons (minor league) players
Caribbean Series managers
Chicago Cubs players
Cleveland Indians players
Colorado Springs Sky Sox players
Columbus Clippers players
Dominican Republic baseball coaches
Dominican Republic expatriate baseball people in Mexico
Dominican Republic expatriate baseball players in the United States
Dominican Republic national baseball team people
Gulf Coast Pirates players
Hawaii Islanders players
Harrisburg Senators players
Iowa Cubs players

Major League Baseball players from the Dominican Republic
Major League Baseball shortstops
Mexican League baseball managers
Minor league baseball managers
Nashua Pirates players
People from Santa Cruz de Mao
People from Valverde Province
Pittsburgh Pirates players
Prince William Pirates players
Seattle Mariners players
Tacoma Rainiers players
Watertown Pirates players